The Harkness Hornet was a four-cylinder inline, water-cooled aircraft engine produced in Australia in the 1920s. It used a cylinder bank from a Hispano-Suiza 8 attached to a crankcase of local design.

References

External links
 Powerhouse Museum

1920s aircraft piston engines